Zechariah Joshua Henry Medley (born 9 July 2000) is an English professional footballer who plays as a centre-back for  KV Oostende.

Club career
Born in Greenwich, Greater London, Medley joined the youth academy at Chelsea when he was eight years old.

Arsenal 
Upon leaving Chelsea, he joined the youth academy at Arsenal in December 2016. He captained the Arsenal under-18's at the beginning of the 2017–18 season before moving to the under-23 side.

On 22 October 2018, Medley appeared on the bench for the Arsenal senior side for the first time in a Premier League match against Leicester City. A month later, on 29 November, Medley made his senior competitive debut for Arsenal in the Europa League against Vorskla Poltava, coming on as a 60th-minute substitute for Rob Holding.

Loan spells
Medley had joined League One club Gillingham on a season-long loan on 10 August 2020, becoming their fourth signing of the summer. On 5 September, he made his debut in a 1–0 win against Southend United in the EFL Cup. He made a total of 18 appearances for the club before he was recalled on 1 February 2021.  He immediately joined Scottish Premiership side Kilmarnock on loan until the end of the season. On 6 February, he made his debut in a 2–0 loss against St Mirren in the Scottish Premiership. On 27 February, he scored his first goal for Kilmarnock in a 1–1 draw against Dundee United in the Scottish Premiership.

KV Oostende
On 21 June 2021, Medley joined Belgian First Division A side KV Oostende on a permanent deal, signing a four-year contract with the option of an additional year.

International career
Born in England, Medley is of Jamaican descent. He is a youth international for England.

Career statistics

References

External links
Arsenal Football Club profile.

2000 births
Living people
Footballers from Greenwich
English footballers
England youth international footballers
Association football defenders
Arsenal F.C. players
Gillingham F.C. players
Kilmarnock F.C. players
English Football League players
Scottish Professional Football League players
Black British sportspeople
English people of Jamaican descent